Acisoma trifidum is a species of dragonfly in the family Libellulidae known commonly as the ivory pintail. It is native to Africa, where it is widespread. It lives near swamps. Though much of its habitat is declining, it is common and not considered to be a threatened species.

References

Libellulidae
Insects described in 1889
Taxonomy articles created by Polbot